PSAP may refer to:
Prosaposin, a protein associated with Gaucher disease
Public-safety answering point
Prostatic-specific acid phosphatase
Personal sound amplification products
Presentation Service Access Point, see Service Access Point
PSAP Sigli, an Indonesian football club
Puget Sound and Pacific Railroad, a railroad in Washington, United States
Preservation self-assessment program, a collection care tool for heritage institutions